In probability theory, an isotropic measure is any mathematical measure that is invariant under linear isometries. It is a standard simplification and assumption used in probability theory. Generally, it is used in the context of measure theory on -dimensional Euclidean space, for which it can be intuitive to study measures that are unchanged by rotations and translations. An obvious example of such a measure is the standard way of assigning a measure to subsets of n-dimensional Euclidean space: Lebesgue measure.

Definition 

Example 
In this case, .

Unimodal measure 
In probability theory it is common that another assumption is added to measures in addition to the measure being isotropic. It is possible that .

Isotropic and unimodal stochastic processes 
In studying stochastic processes, in particular Lévy processes, a reasonable assumption to make is that, for each element of the index set, the probability distributions of the random variables are isotropic or even unimodal measures.

More specifically, an isotropic Lévy process is a Lévy process, such that all its distributions, are isotropic measures. A unimodal Lévy process (or isotropic unimodal Lévy process) is a Lévy process, such that all its distributions, are unimodal measures.

See also 
 Measure (mathematics)
 Stochastic process
 Lévy process

References 

Probability theory
Measures (measure theory)